Brantford is a city in southwestern Ontario, Canada.

Brantford may also refer to:

Brantford (electoral district), a Federal electoral district that was represented from 1904 to 1925 and from 1949 to 1968
Brantford (provincial electoral district), in existence from 1925 to 1996
HMCS Brantford, a World War II ship of the Royal Canadian Navy
Mickey Brantford (1911–1984), English actor and filmmaker

See also
Branford (disambiguation)
Brentford (disambiguation)